The Smurfs: The Legend of Smurfy Hollow  is a direct-to-video American computer/traditionally animated comedy adventure film based on The Smurfs comic book series created by the Belgian comics artist Peyo. A sequel of The Smurfs 2 (2013), the movie was written by Todd Berger and directed by Stephan Franck, and it stars the voices of Melissa Sturm, Fred Armisen, Anton Yelchin and Hank Azaria. The film was produced by Sony Pictures Animation with the animation by Sony Pictures Imageworks and Duck Studios. The Smurfs: The Legend of Smurfy Hollow was released on DVD on September 10, 2013. The film is loosely based on Washington Irving's 1820 short story "The Legend of Sleepy Hollow".

Plot
As the story begins, Clumsy, Hefty, and Panicky (Voices By Anton Yelchin, Gary Basaraba and Adam Wylie) are out in the forest at night with a cart full of smurfberries that has a broken wheel. Unable to fix the wheel, the three of them sit together around a campfire roasting smurfberries when Clumsy has the idea of telling a ghost story to pass the time. Narrator (Voiced By Tom Kane) then joins the three Smurfs to tell his own kind of ghost story.

In Narrator's story, the Smurfs gather around for Papa Smurf (Voiced by Jack Angel) to announce the Smurfberry Harvest contest in which the Smurfs who collect the most smurfberries will be awarded a medal. Brainy (Voiced By Fred Armisen) shows up at the gathering wearing multiple medals that he has won in the past nine years, gloating about how he's going to win this year's medal as well. As the Smurfs collect their buckets and then go out into the forest to pick smurfberries, Gutsy (Voiced By Alan Cumming) follows Brainy to find out where he's been getting all the smurfberries for winning the contest. He discovers that it is in a place called Smurfy Hollow, an area where the legendary Headless Horseman resides, where there is a secret patch of smurfberries growing plentifully. Gutsy decides to give Brainy a scare by creating a shadow figure of the Headless Horseman, which sends the bespectacled Smurf running in fear. However, while Gutsy uses this opportunity to collect the smurfberries in the secret patch, Brainy finds himself walking into a trap set up by the evil wizard Gargamel (Voiced By Hank Azaria).

By the time the contest ends and the Smurfs have appeared with their buckets for Papa Smurf to judge the winner, Gutsy shows up with a bucket overloaded with smurfberries and thus is declared the winner. However, Suspicious Smurf begins to wonder where Brainy is, since he hasn't shown up with his bucket of smurfberries. Realizing that he may be found out for cheating, Gutsy goes out into the forest alone to find Brainy, but is soon joined by Smurfette (Voiced By Melissa Sturm), who finds out from Gutsy that Brainy is in Smurfy Hollow. They both go together and find Brainy in a cage trap set up by Gargamel, only to soon join him in cage traps of their own. Azrael (Voiced By Frank Welker), who was prowling the forest by himself, is soon alerted to the Smurfs' presence and goes to get his master to inform him of the captured Smurfs.

Gutsy, Brainy, and Smurfette work on a plan to get themselves out of their cages, and soon Gutsy swings his cage repeatedly until it bumps into Brainy's, which then bumps into Smurfette's, and the cages continue to bump into each other until Gutsy's and Brainy's cages break, freeing them. However, Smurfette is still stuck in her cage, and Gutsy and Brainy try to figure out how to get her out of there when Gargamel appears with Azrael, and so they go into hiding while the evil wizard opens the cage to deal with the one Smurf that is still captured.

But soon the five of them have a new problem to deal with—the presence of the Headless Horseman, who rides around looking for his next victims. They start running for their lives toward the covered bridge, which legends say is the only thing that keeps the Headless Horseman trapped in Smurfy Hollow. But as the Smurfs see that they would not get to the covered bridge in time to escape from the Headless Horseman, they hitch a ride on the back of a bat and fly to the top of the covered bridge, safe from the spectral rider's grasp. Gargamel and Azrael soon reach the bridge that the Headless Horseman cannot pass through, and safe inside the bridge, the evil wizard taunts the ghost, who then responds by throwing a flaming pumpkin that causes the floor beneath him and his cat to break, sending them down the river and over the waterfalls.

With the three Smurfs returning safely home, Gutsy and Brainy begin to apologize to each other for what they did, with Gutsy admitting that he was jealous about Brainy always winning and Brainy admitting that he was selfish in keeping the secret patch of smurfberries all to himself. Glad to see that two of his little Smurfs have learned their lesson, Papa Smurf proceeds to reward Gutsy with the medal, but Gutsy decides to give it to Brainy instead, who then insists that Gutsy should have it, and so the two Smurfs fight over who should get the medal when it flies out of their hands and lands looped around Lazy's neck, thereby declaring him to be the winner. As the Smurfs gather around the stage to see Gutsy and Brainy dance with each other, Papa Smurf goes out into the forest to thank the Headless Horseman, who turns out to be a goat that he used his magic on to make him appear as a ghost.

With Narrator Smurf's ghost story now over, Hefty claims that he wasn't scared, but finds himself jumping into Narrator Smurf's arms at the sound of a bat screeching. Clumsy sees that they are now surrounded by bats, which scares all four Smurfs and sends them running back to the village.

Voice cast
 Fred Armisen as Brainy Smurf
 Melissa Sturm as Smurfette
 Jack Angel as Papa Smurf
 Alan Cumming as Gutsy Smurf
 Anton Yelchin as Clumsy Smurf
 Hank Azaria as Gargamel
 Tom Kane as Narrator Smurf
 John Oliver as Vanity Smurf
 Gary Basaraba as Hefty Smurf
 Adam Wylie as Panicky Smurf
 Frank Welker as Azrael

Production
In September 2013, in an interview with Entertainment Tonight the director of the film, Stephan Franck, spoke about what made him want to direct the film, saying: "My attachment to this story is really the fall. The history of it, the colors of it, the spookiness of it a little bit, that's what was really great in this -- within the Smurfs' universe, to bring in ... a little bit of the mystery, which is in the books. I think there is an artistry to the fall, the colors are really inspiring." Stephan Franck also spoke about the film's take on The Legend of Sleepy Hollow, saying: "We didn't want to do something pretty scary, like the Tim Burton version [of Sleepy Hollow], because it's a different audience. We went in the direction of making him ghostly, so he's kind of a glow-in-the-dark ghost -- it says scary, and it gives you all the visual intensity, but it doesn't have the darkness of something that wouldn't be right for our audience."

In September 2013, in an interview with The Huffington Post the director of the film, Stephan Franck, spoke about why they decided to use hand-drawn animation on the film, saying: "Don't get me wrong. The crew here in Culver City is great when it comes to creating CG Smurfs. But when I was growing up, the Smurfs that I watched on Saturday morning were hand-drawn. And I was thinking that -- after Sony's success with its two live-action / computer animated Smurf movies -- that it might be fun for us to try something a bit more old school. Return the Smurfs to their more traditional roots, if you will."

He also explained that Disney animator Mary Blair inspired some of the film's animation, saying: "Mary was the master when it came to mixing bold shapes & colors. And given that this story is set in the Fall -- a time of year that I absolutely love -- Well, the bold colors that you see in the leaves during this time of year just made taking a Mary Blair-inspired approach to the design of this entire production seem like a natural choice to me. Besides, given that Mary color-designed Disney's own take on The Legend of Sleepy Hollow back in the late 1940s, it only seemed right that Blair's work serve as an influence on Smurfy Hollow as well. So I asked my production designer Sean Eckols to explore this idea and he delivered in spades."

He also explained why he wanted to turn the film into a celebration of hand-drawn animation, saying: "You have to understand that I grew up reading the Smurfs. And that -- while I liked the Saturday morning cartoon show and all -- I felt that it never really did justice to the superior line work & design that I saw in the Smurfs comic books and comic strips. Which is why I really wanted to do this home premiere as a mostly hand-drawn production. So that I could finally see these characters the way that I always thought they could be done. As these fully realized, traditionally animated characters. Which is why it was great to get the reaction that we did at Annecy. With the audience there being so supportive of Smurfy Hollow because they had never seen these characters done with feature quality hand-drawn animation before."

He also spoke about how the CGI Smurfs were animated by the same people who did The Smurfs and The Smurfs 2, saying: "And those people did a brilliant job of creating the bookends for Smurfy Hollow. Effectively creating a transition from the live-action / CG Smurf movies that most people know nowadays to the traditionally animated home premiere that we were trying to make here. And given the extremely short production schedule on this project -- we did this whole thing in less than a year, with the CG elements being produced during whatever downtime we had on Smurfs 2 -- it's a real tribute to the artists and technicians who work at Sony Pictures Animation that this holiday special turned out as well at it did."

He also explained how the film was a celebration of the original Smurfs comic books and comic strips, saying: "When the team at Sony Pictures Animation initially started working on The Smurfs: The Legend of Smurfy Hollow, we thankfully all shared a very strong vision of the sort of movie that we wanted this home premiere to be. Which was this celebration of the original Smurfs comic books & comic strips that used traditional, hand-drawn animation as a way to harken back to all that strong line work and design. And as someone who started his career in 2D, I'm just glad that this holiday special turned out as well as it did."

Release
The film premiered on June 11, 2013 at the Annecy International Animated Film Festival. The film was released on DVD on September 10, 2013. ABC Family aired the network television premiere of the film on October 27, 2013.

Critical response
The Smurfs: The Legend of Smurfy Hollow was met with positive reviews from critics. Greg Ehrbar of Indie Wire gave the film a positive review, saying "The CG animation in the bookend sequences certainly looks as rich and detailed as they did in the last Smurf feature (and most likely were made from elements carried over from that production into this one). These segments are dimensional and seem to be the “real world,” as it were. But when the cel-animation bursts onto the high-def screen, it has a luminescence that reminds you why this technique is unique unto itself. The blazing primary color, stunning backgrounds and varied angles seem to be "making a case" for traditional animation. It's unlikely that this comparison was not the intent. And it doesn't necessarily suggest one approach is better than another, just that they are dramatically different."

References

External links
 

2013 films
2013 computer-animated films
2010s American animated films
2010s animated short films
Animated films based on comics
Sony Pictures Animation short films
Films based on Belgian comics
Films based on multiple works
Films based on The Legend of Sleepy Hollow
Films scored by Christopher Lennertz
Films set in forests
The Smurfs in film
2013 comedy films
2010s English-language films